Gowd Gach-e Sofla (also Romanized as Gowd Gach-e Soflá) is a village in Holayjan Rural District, in the Central District of Izeh County, Khuzestan Province, Iran. At the 2006 census, its population was 176, in 27 families.

References 

Populated places in Izeh County